William L. Campbell (September 5, 1946 – February 9, 2005) was a Canadian film editor who is best known for his work on David Winning's first feature film Storm.

He was also notable as one of the original founding members of the Calgary Society of Independent Filmmakers in 1976.

He was responsible for editing several award-winning First Nations documentaries in Vancouver, British Columbia.  
His ex-wife Dale and three children live in Calgary, Alberta.

Filmography as Editor
 T'Lina: The Rendering of Wealth (1999)
 Qatuwas: People Gathering Together (1997)
 Laxwesa Wa: Strength of the River (1995)
 Bombs Away (1988)
 Storm. (1987) ... aka Turbulences (Canada: French title)
 Sequence (1980)

External links

1946 births
2005 deaths
Canadian film editors